Cristoforo Diana (1543 – 1636) was an Italian painter active in his native San Vito al Tagliamento.

Works

 Portrait of Oristilla Partistagno, 1573, villa Toppo, Buttrio;
 Crucifixion, San Vito al Tagliamento, numero civico 195; 
 Holy Family, San Vito al Tagliamento,; 
 Gonfalone for the Scuola di san Tommaso, 1575, Portogruaro
 St Valentino, 1578, Abbey of Santa Maria in Sylvis, Sesto al Reghena; 
 Frescoes, 1587, now Parish church of Settimo; 
 Altarpiece, 1587, parish church of San Stino; 
 Frescoes 1590, now Church of Floriano, San Giovanni di Casarsa; 
 Gonfalone or banner, 1591, parish church of Prodolone; 
 Altarpiece, 1593, parrocchiale di Prodolone; 
 St Martin and two saints, 1593, casa Colossi at San Vito al Tagliamento; 
 Altarpiece, 1594, parish church of Giussago; 
 Gonfalone, 1598, parish church of Cordovado; 
 other, 1611, parish of Meduno; 
 Gonfalone for the scuola of St Valentino, 1612, parish church of Gleris;
Holy Trinity with Saints, 1615, parish church of Villanova della Cartera.

Bibliography
  Dizionario Biografico Italiano, entry on Cristoforo Diana, by Paolo Goi, 1991, volume 39, accessed = 13 August 2012.
Mainly translated from Italian Wikipedia

1543 births
1646 deaths
Italian Renaissance painters
16th-century Italian painters
Italian male painters
17th-century Italian painters
People from San Vito al Tagliamento